Sarah Anne Stratigakis (born March 7, 1999) is a Canadian soccer player who plays as a midfielder for Vittsjö GIK in the Damallsvenskan and the Canada national team.

Early life
Stratigakis was eight years old when she started playing soccer. She played youth soccer with Woodbridge Strikers and Unionville Milliken SC.

College career
In 2017, she began attending the University of Michigan, where she played for the women's soccer team. She made her debut on August 17, scoring 7 minutes and 16 seconds into her debut in a 2-0 victory over the Washington Huskies. In her freshman season, she was named to the Big Ten All-Freshman Team and the Big Ten Second Team All-Star. In 2018, she was once again named to the All-Big 10 Second Team. In 2019, she was named Big Ten Midfielder of the Year, an All-Big 0 First Team All-Star, and a Second Team All-American. In 2020, she was an Academic All-Big Ten Selections. In 2021, she was named to the All-Big Ten Second Team for the fourth time, which along with her First Team selection in 2019, set a school record for being named to the conference all-star teams five times. She was also named to the United Soccer Coaches All-North Region Second Team in 2021.

Club career
In 2016 and 2017, Stratigakis began playing for Aurora FC in League1 Ontario. She made her debut on May 7, 2016 against Vaughan Azzurri. She scored her first goals on May 28, netting a brace against the Kingston Clippers in a 3-3 draw. On August 20, she scored a hat trick against the Sanjaxx Lions. That season, she was named to the mid-season L1O All-Star team that faced the Quebec all-stars, was named the league Young Player of the Year, and was named to the league First Team All-Star. The following season, she scored four goals in five appearances and was once again named to the mid-season all-star game.

In 2018, she joined Oakville Blue Devils FC in League1 Ontario, scoring five goals in only 3 appearances, including a hat trick on August 21 against Darby FC. In 2019, she scored four goals in only two appearances, netting a brace in each match.

In 2022, she joined Swedish club Vittsjö GIK in the first-tier Damallsvenskan.

International career
Stratigakis has represented Canada on the under-15, under-17, under-20 and senior national teams.

In August 2014, she was named the most valuable player (MVP) of the 2014 CONCACAF Girls' U-15 Championship where Canada won gold. In December 2015, she scored a brace against Honduras at the 2015 CONCACAF Women's U-20 Championship to lift Canada to the semifinals. She scored the team's only goal  in Canada's 1–2 loss to Haiti. She was named the tournament's best midfielder at the 2014 FIFA U-17 Women's World Cup at the age of 15 after helping Canada reach the quarterfinals. At the 2016 FIFA U-17 Women's World Cup, she served as team captain.

In July 2015, Stratigakis made her debut for the senior national team at the Pan Am Games at the age of 16. She scored her first goal for the national team at the 2021 SheBelieves Cup, against Argentina.

Career statistics

International 
Scores and results list Canada's goal tally first, score column indicates score after each Stratigakis goal.

List of international goals scored by Sarah Stratigakis

Honours

Individual 

 CONCACAF Girls' Under-15 Championship Golden Ball: 2014
 CONCACAF Girls' Under-15 Championship Best XI: 2014

References

External links
 
 

1999 births
Living people
Canada women's international soccer players
Canadian people of Greek descent
Canadian women's soccer players
Footballers at the 2015 Pan American Games
Soccer players from Toronto
Michigan Wolverines women's soccer players
Women's association football midfielders
Pan American Games competitors for Canada
Unionville Milliken SC (women) players
Aurora FC (Canada) players
Blue Devils FC (women) players
League1 Ontario (women) players